PeaceHealth is a not-for-profit health care system that owns and operates ten hospitals, and numerous clinics, in the Western United States. Headquartered in Vancouver, Washington, the organization has operations in Alaska, Oregon, and Washington, and was founded by the Catholic Sisters of St. Joseph of Peace in 1976.

History
In 1890, nuns of the Sisters of St. Joseph of Peace moved to Fairhaven, Washington, from the convent in Newark, New Jersey, to establish a hospital for loggers. The order continued to build hospitals and in 1936 opened their first one in Oregon, Pacific Christian Hospital in Eugene. After continued growth, the Sisters formed a non-profit health care system in 1976, and in 1994 the name was changed to PeaceHealth. In 1997, PeaceHealth merged its SelectCare health insurance plan with Providence Health & Services, which at the time PeaceHealth was based in Eugene.

PeaceHealth merged with Southwest Washington Health System in December 2010, and moved its headquarters from Bellevue, Washington, to Vancouver, Washington. At the time, PeaceHealth had annual revenues of approximately $1.3 billion and operated seven hospitals. The organization announced an alliance with University of Washington Medical Center in May 2013, which the American Civil Liberties Union criticized due to PeaceHealth following Catholic medical care directives.

Operations
PeaceHealth operates ten hospitals in three states. In Alaska, it runs PeaceHealth Ketchikan Medical Center in Ketchikan. In Oregon, PeaceHealth operates Sacred Heart Medical Center, University District (Eugene), Sacred Heart Medical Center at RiverBend (Springfield), Peace Harbor Medical Center (Florence), and Cottage Grove Community Medical Center (Cottage Grove). In Washington, it owns Peacehealth Southwest Washington Medical Center (Vancouver), PeaceHealth St. John Medical Center (Longview), PeaceHealth St. Joseph Medical Center (Bellingham), PeaceHealth Peace Island Medical Center (Friday Harbor), and PeaceHealth United General Medical Center (Sedro-Woolley).

The organization's PeaceHealth Medical Group employs approximately 800 medical providers and operates medical clinics across all three states. Their laboratories, known as the separate unit PeaceHealthLabs, are also wide-known.

See also
 ZoomCare

References

Catholic health care
Companies based in Vancouver, Washington
Healthcare in Washington (state)
Hospital networks in the United States
Healthcare in Oregon
Health care companies established in 1976
1976 establishments in Oregon
Medical and health organizations based in Washington (state)
Catholic hospital networks in the United States